Michel Zumkeller (born 21 January 1966 in Belfort) is a French politician of the Union of Democrats and Independents (UDI), part of the Radical Party, who has been serving as a member of the National Assembly of France, representing the Territoire de Belfort department. 

In parliament, Zumkeller serves on the Finance Committee. He was previously a member of the Committee on Cultural Affairs and Education (2017-2020) and the Committee on Legal Affairs (2009-2020). 

He lost his seat in the first round of the 2022 French legislative election.

References

1966 births
Living people
Politicians from Belfort
Republican Party (France) politicians
Union for French Democracy politicians
Liberal Democracy (France) politicians
Radical Party (France) politicians
Union for a Popular Movement politicians
Deputies of the 12th National Assembly of the French Fifth Republic
Deputies of the 13th National Assembly of the French Fifth Republic
Deputies of the 14th National Assembly of the French Fifth Republic
Deputies of the 15th National Assembly of the French Fifth Republic
Union of Democrats and Independents politicians